Madone is a comune (municipality) in the Province of Bergamo in the Italian region of Lombardy, located about  northeast of Milan and about  southwest of Bergamo.

Madone borders the following municipalities: Bonate Sotto, Bottanuco, Chignolo d'Isola, Filago.

Demographic evolution

Twin towns — sister cities
Madone is twinned with:

  Dissay, France 
  Vila Nova da Barquinha, Portugal

References